St. John Neumann is a Roman Catholic parish in the Archdiocese of Philadelphia. The church is located at 380 Highland Lane in Bryn Mawr, Pennsylvania.

Information
The parish was founded as Blessed John Neumann by Archbishop John Krol in June 1964, to serve the Catholics on the Main Line in Delaware County, Pennsylvania. Its namesake is the fourth Bishop of Philadelphia, John Nepomucene Neumann. During the year prior to the parish’s erection, Pope Paul VI beatified Neumann and thus permitted public veneration of him.

The first pastor of St. John Neumann was Fr. Edward Murphy, who celebrated Mass in the gymnasium of St. Aloysius Academy before the parish church was built.  of land was later purchased from the Sisters of St. Francis of Glen Riddle, Pennsylvania, and the first Mass in the church was held on August 20, 1967. On June 19, 1977, Bishop Neumann was canonized by Pope Paul, and the parish thus changed its name to St. John Neumann.

The parish is also served by the Sisters of St. Joseph. Its parochial school, Ss. Colman-John Neumann, is consolidated and also serves St. Colman Parish in Ardmore.

St. John Neumann Parish is located under the Delaware County Vicariate of the archdiocese, headed by Monsignor John Breslin.

List of pastors
Edward Murphy (1964–1978)
James Meehan (1978–2002)
James McKeaney (2002–2017)
Michael Matz (2017–present)

External links

Official site

Roman Catholic churches in Pennsylvania
Roman Catholic Archdiocese of Philadelphia
Philadelphia Main Line
Christian organizations established in 1964
Churches in Delaware County, Pennsylvania